Yosef Serlin (24 February 1906 – 15 January 1974) was a Zionist activist, lawyer and Israeli politician.

Biography
Serlin was born in Białystok in the Russian Empire (now in Poland), where he attended a Hebrew High School. He studied law at the University of Warsaw and was certified as a lawyer in 1929. He was active in the Zionist Movement in Poland and was chairman of the Federation of Academic Zionists in Warsaw. He was made personal secretary to Nahum Sokolow in 1930. He was also a member of the Central Committee of Radical Zionists in Poland.

In 1933, he immigrated to the British Mandate of Palestine and worked as a lawyer in Tel Aviv. He was one of the founders of the General Zionists and later deputy chairman of the World Confederation of General Zionists Association. He was also a member of the Zionist Actions Committee.

After the establishment of the State of Israel in 1948, he was a member of the Provisional State Council. He was then elected to the first through fourth Knessets for the General Zionists. In 1954, he joined Yosef Sapir and Simha Erlich to tighten their grip on the party. However, 1957 saw a schism between him and Sapir and a decline of his power within the party. In 1961, he became one of leaders of the Liberal Party, for which he was elected to the fifth Knesset. The Liberal Party then merged into Gahal, for which he was elected to the sixth and seventh Knessets. He was a member of the House, Labor, Constitution, Law and Justice, Economic Affairs, and Finance Committees. He was also deputy Speaker of the Knesset in the 5th and 6th Knesset.

In 1952, he served as Minister of Transportation and from 1952 as Minister of Health until 1955. He sought to strengthen the national control over the health system at the expense of the Israel's sick funds. He was a hawkish minister, and Moshe Sharett wrote in his diary that Serlin had asked him in 1954 to attack the Gaza Strip in reprisal to the Palestinian Fedayeen insurgencies. In 1958, he proposed a mixed election system, according to which most MKs were to be elected from thirty voting zones.

He died in 1974.

References

External links

1906 births
1974 deaths
20th-century Israeli lawyers
20th-century Polish lawyers
Burials at Nahalat Yitzhak Cemetery
Deputy Speakers of the Knesset
Gahal politicians
General Zionists politicians
Jewish Israeli politicians
Lawyers from Warsaw
Liberal Party (Israel) politicians
Members of the 1st Knesset (1949–1951)
Members of the 2nd Knesset (1951–1955)
Members of the 3rd Knesset (1955–1959)
Members of the 4th Knesset (1959–1961)
Members of the 5th Knesset (1961–1965)
Members of the 6th Knesset (1965–1969)
Members of the 7th Knesset (1969–1974)
Ministers of Health of Israel
Ministers of Transport of Israel
People from Białystok
Polish emigrants to Israel
20th-century Polish Jews
Polish Zionists
University of Warsaw alumni
Zionist activists